Tân Bình Gymnasium is an indoor sports arena, located in Ho Chi Minh City, Vietnam. The arena opened in February 1997 with a capacity of 2,000 seats.

Usage
Tân Bình Gymnasium was the venue for Badminton events at the 2003 Southeast Asian Games. In 2009, it was used as the main venue for 2009 Asian Indoor Games' women's futsal matches.

Saigon Heat, Vietnam's first professional basketball team, named Tân Bình Stadium as its home court when the team joined the ASEAN Basketball League in 2012. Saigon Heat moved its home court to CIS Arena in 2014.

Tân Bình Stadium played host for the ABL's first ever Hoops Fest, an annual mid-season showcase of the league, which was held 15 March 2013 to 17 March 2013.

External links
Official website

References

Indoor arenas in Vietnam
ASEAN Basketball League venues
Sports venues in Ho Chi Minh City
Badminton venues
Badminton in Vietnam